David George Ribbans (born 29 August 1995) is a South African born English rugby union player, currently playing with English Premiership side Northampton Saints. His regular position is lock.

Early life
Ribbans was born and grew up in Somerset West, Western Cape, South Africa.

Rugby career

2014–2016: Youth rugby / Western Province
He attended and played rugby at Somerset College, and, despite never being selected to play provincial rugby at schoolboy level, he joined the Western Province Rugby Institute after high school.

He was included in the  squad that participated in the 2014 Under-19 Provincial Championship. He didn't feature in the first seven rounds of the competition, but played off the bench in their next match against the s before being promoted to the starting lineup for their next match against the s and remained in the starting lineup for the remainder of the competition.

In the second half of 2015, he played for the  team in Group A of the Under-21 Provincial Championship, where he quickly became a key player, featuring in ten of their twelve matches during the regular season. He scored a try against  as Western Province finished top of the log, winning ten of their matches. Ribbans started their semi-final match against the Golden Lions and scored a try five minutes before half time as his side ran out 43–20 winners. He scored his third try of the season in the final, scoring Western Province's fourth of six tries in a 52–17 victory over the s in Johannesburg to win a youth competition for the second season in a row.

At the start of 2016, Ribbans was named in the  squad for the 2016 Super Rugby season, but didn't feature in any of their matches. He played in four matches for a  team that finished top of the 2016 Currie Cup qualification series, winning thirteen out of their fourteen matches. He once again reverted to the  side in the second half of the season, scoring a try against  in one of his six appearances in the 2016 Under-21 Provincial Championship. It proved to be a vital try for Western Province who were 28–20 down at the time in a match they had to win to ensure qualification to the semi-finals, with fly-half Robert du Preez's subsequent conversion and penalty five minutes later enough to secure third place on the log for Ribbans' team.

2017–present: Northampton Saints

After the 2016 season, Ribbans moved to England to join Premiership side Northampton Saints, with the team announcing his signing on 5 January 2017.

Starting his first game in a Saints shirt in a friendly against Bedford, Ribbans quickly established himself as a first-team contender with a hat trick against the RFU Championship side.

The lock has since progressed into the first team, earning over 100 appearances for Saints so far and proving to be a favourite with the Saints supporters for his high work-rate and big hits.

International career
In October 2020 Ribbans was called up to a senior England training squad by head coach Eddie Jones.

References

External links

South African rugby union players
Living people
1995 births
People from Somerset West
Rugby union locks
Western Province (rugby union) players
Rugby union players from the Western Cape
England international rugby union players